Antarcticibacterium arcticum is a Gram-negative, aerobic rod-shaped and non-motile bacterium from the genus of Antarcticibacterium  which has been isolated from surface sediments from the Beaufort Sea.

References 

Flavobacteria
Bacteria described in 2020